The Wright Gemini 2 is a double-decker bus built by Wrightbus between 2009 and 2013. It was announced in December 2007 but was not named until 2008. It was constructed as a semi-integral vehicle, with chassis modules provided by VDL. The bodywork utilised some lighter materials so that the vehicle was lighter than the Eclipse Gemini and Pulsar Gemini bodied buses. It was available in two versions; the Gemini 2 DL diesel-powered version, and the Gemini 2 HEV diesel-electric hybrid version.

Versions
The Gemini 2 was launched in 2007 as the replacement for the Pulsar Gemini and one-off Pulsar Gemini HEV. It was semi-integral, being based on the updated VDL DB300 chassis. The first two were produced with identical bodywork to the original Pulsar Gemini, however, on subsequent production models, the front and rear ends of the body were facelifted to match the Volvo based Eclipse Gemini 2. It was unveiled at the National Exhibition Centre in November 2008, with a First London Gemini 2 HEV appearing at the show.

Gemini 2 DL
The Gemini 2 DL was offered with Cummins ISBe 6-cylinder engines with Voith or ZF Friedrichshafen gearboxes. A total of 462 Gemini 2 DLs were built between 2009 and 2013, mainly for Arriva, including 322 for its Arriva London subsidiary. First London and London General were the only other customers, taking four and one respectively. A low height version with a flat roof was introduced in 2009 with Arriva North East and Arriva Yorkshire the first customers.

Gemini 2 HEV

The Gemini 2 HEV was offered with a Siemens series hybrid drive system with a 2.4 litre 4-cylinder Ford Puma engine for power generation.

Ten Gemini 2 HEVs were built, Arriva London and First London each purchased five for use on routes 141 and 328. Arriva's being sold to Ensignbus and later to Crosville Motor Services for use as open top buses in Weston-super-Mare while First's were transferred to First West of England and First York.

In 2014, the Gemini 2 was superseded by the StreetDeck.

References

Further reading
Wrightbus leading the hybrid electric way in London Wrightbus 2 October 2008
Gemini 2 - Wrightbus points the way to the future of double deckers Wrightbus 4 November 2008
Buses issue 645 December 2008

External links

Double-decker buses
Hybrid electric buses
Low-floor buses
Vehicles introduced in 2007
Gemini 2